Intelsat 509, previously named Intelsat V F-9, was a communications satellite operated by Intelsat. Launched in 1984, it was the ninth of fifteen Intelsat V satellites to be launched. The Intelsat V series was constructed by Ford Aerospace, based on the Intelsat-V satellite bus. Intelsat V F-9 was part of an advanced series of satellites designed to provide greater telecommunications capacity for Intelsat's global network. He also carried a Maritime Communications Services (MCS) package for Inmarsat. However, the launch vehicle failed to put the satellite into a useful orbit.

The satellite launch took place on June 9, 1984, at 23:03 UTC, by means of an Atlas-Centaur G-D1AR vehicle from the Cape Canaveral Air Force Station, Florida, United States. It had a launch mass of 1,928 kg. The Intelsat 509 was equipped with 4 Ku-band transponders more 21 C-band transponders for 12,000 audio circuits and 2 TV channels.

References

Spacecraft launched in 1984
Intelsat satellites
Satellite launch failures